Grevillea papillosa is a species of flowering plant in the family Proteaceae and is endemic to the South West region of Western Australia. It is a spreading shrub with narrowly elliptic to linear, as well as deeply divided leaves, and pink-tinged, white flowers with a reddish-pink style.

Description
The edges of the leaves are rolled under partly enclosing the glabrous lower surface. Flowering mainly occurs from December to April and the fruit is an elliptic follicle.<ref name=FB>{{FloraBase|name=Grevillea papillosa |id=14911}}</ref>

Taxonomy
This grevillea was first formally described in 1986 by Donald McGillivray who gave it the name Grevillea manglesioides subsp. papillosa, in his book New Names in Grevillea (Proteaceae) from specimens collected by Barbara Briggs near Pemberton in 1976. In 1994, Peter Olde and Neil Marriott raised the subspecies to species status as G. papillosa in The Grevillea Book. The specific epithet (papillosa) means "papillose", referring to the inside of the perianth.

Distribution and habitatGrevillea papillosa'' grows in winter-wet areas and in swamps between Nannup and the Scott River in the Jarrah Forest and Warren bioregions of south-western Western Australia.

Conservation status
This grevillea is listed as "Priority Three" by the Government of Western Australia Department of Biodiversity, Conservation and Attractions, meaning that it is poorly known and known from only a few locations but is not under imminent threat.

See also
 List of Grevillea species

References

papillosa
Proteales of Australia
Eudicots of Western Australia
Taxa named by Donald McGillivray
Plants described in 1986